Claudio Báez (23 March 1948 – 19 November 2017) was a Mexican television actor. He is best known for his work in Televisa telenovelas.

Filmography

Television

References

External links
 

1948 births
2017 deaths
20th-century Mexican male actors
21st-century Mexican male actors
Mexican male telenovela actors
Mexican male television actors
Male actors from Guadalajara, Jalisco
Respiratory disease deaths in Mexico
Deaths from chronic obstructive pulmonary disease